The Keladi Shivappa Nayaka University of Agricultural and Horticultural Sciences, Shimoga (KSNUAHS) is a university in the Indian state of Karnataka. It is the state's first integrated university to have both agricultural and horticultural sciences under its purview.

History 
UAHS was established under Karnataka Act no. 38 of 2012, vide notification no. Sam. Vya. Sha. ilakhe, 19 Shasana 2012, dated 21-09-2012 published in the Special Gazette of Karnataka, part IV – A, No. 656, on 21-09-2012. The university was created by separating seven districts from the jurisdictional area of University of Agricultural Sciences, Bangalore and including all the institutes that came under the University of Horticultural Sciences, Bagalkot. The jurisdictional area of UAHS, Shimoga covers the districts of Shimoga district, Chikkamagaluru district, Udupi district, Dakshina Kannada district, Kodagu district, Davanagere district and Chitradurga district.

UAHS came into independent existence on 1 April 2013 with P.M. Salimath serving as Special Officer. Later in 2014 C. Vasudevappa, formerly the dean of post graduation studies at University of Agricultural Sciences, Bangalore, was appointed as first Vice-Chancellor. P. Narayanaswamy replaced Vasudevappa in July 2017 and Manjunatha K. Naik replaced him in April 2018.

Campus 

The headquarters of UAHS, Shimoga, is connected to the state capital, Bangalore by road (NH 206) and NH 13 also passes through the city. It is also connected to Bangalore by a five-hour train ride. The nearest airport is Bangalore (Bengaluru International Airport or BLR), which is 270 km away and Mangaluru International Airport 189 km. Hubli domestic airport 201 km distance. There are regular Janshatabdi & Intercity SF Express trains available from Bangalore, Mysore, Hassan, Tumkur, Chennai, Tirupathi. Those coming from Mumbai, Chennai, New Delhi, Secunderabad, Vizag, Jaipur, Ahmedabad, Coimbatore can reach up to Birur Jn (RRB) from birur shimoga is just 60 km away.  Regular city buses available every 15 minute once in this route from Gopala, SN Market, HPC,  Jayanagar, Usha nursing home city bus stops.

Affiliated colleges

It has the following colleges:
 College of agriculture, Shimoga
 Horticultural College, Mudigere
 Horticulture College, Hiriyur
 Forestry College, Ponnampet
 Agricultural Diploma Institute, Brahmavar
 Agricultural Diploma Institute, Kathalagere

Academic programmes 
University presently offers degree programs in Agriculture, Horticulture and Forestry disciplines. Ph.D. programs in five disciplines,
Master's degree in 14 disciplines consisting of six in Agriculture, College of Agriculture Shivamogga, six in Horticulture, Horticultural College, Mudigere and two in Forestry, Forestry College, Ponnampet. At present, a two-year Diploma in Agriculture course is being offered at Agricultural and Horticultural Research Station, Kathalagere, and Zonal Agricultural and Horticultural Research Station, Brahmavar.

Student life

Student forums
College of Agriculture, Shivamogga students have a students forum 'SOGADU'. This will organize unique programs like KANNADA HUNNIME-a monthly program, Say Thanks to Farmers, State level Poetry competition, National Level Short Film contest, etc.

Krishi Mela 
UAHS has been conducting Krishi Mela, an agricultural fair, annually from 2013. The event takes place for 3–5 days where there will be exhibition of agricultural technologies from various parts of the country, private sectors will also participate. Agricultural scientists will be available for farmers to solve their farming issues as well. This mega event involves an iconic display of the technologies developed by the university.

See also 
 University of Agricultural Sciences, Dharwad
 University of Agricultural Sciences, Bangalore
 University of Agricultural Sciences, Raichur
 University of Horticultural Sciences, Bagalkot

References

External links 
 

Agricultural universities and colleges in Karnataka
Universities in Karnataka
Education in Shimoga
Universities and colleges in Shimoga district